Anto Jakovljević (born 25 September 1962 in Banja Luka) is a Bosnian-Herzegovinian retired association footballer.

Club career
Jakovljević played for Borac Banja Luka and FK Sarajevo in the Yugoslav First League. Later he played for some lower-league clubs in Slovenia and Croatia.

His first name has also been spelled Anton and Ante.

References

External links
https://web.archive.org/web/20110728033725/http://www.boracbl.net/intervju/f_jakovljevicanton.html
http://www.prvaliga.si/klubi/mostvo/igralec.asp?idi=19634&id=772&all=1

1962 births
Living people
Sportspeople from Banja Luka
Association football goalkeepers
Yugoslav footballers
Bosnia and Herzegovina footballers
FK Borac Banja Luka players
FK Sarajevo players
NK Pazinka players
NK Mura players
NK Ljubljana players
NK Hrvatski Dragovoljac players
HNK Suhopolje players
Yugoslav First League players
Bosnia and Herzegovina expatriate footballers
Expatriate footballers in Slovenia
Bosnia and Herzegovina expatriate sportspeople in Slovenia
Expatriate footballers in Croatia
Bosnia and Herzegovina expatriate sportspeople in Croatia